Clanculus cristinae is a species of sea snail, a marine gastropod mollusk in the family Trochidae, the top snails.

Description

Distribution
This species occurs in the Atlantic Ocean off West Africa.

References

External links

cristinae
Gastropods described in 2002